Cristidorsa is a genus of lizards in the family Agamidae native to India and Myanmar. The name Cristidorsa is Latin for "ridged dorsum", in reference to the ridges on the backs of lizards in this genus. The common name ridged dragons was suggested by the authors of the 2018 genus description. The species were originally placed in the genus Japalura.

Species
Species include:

Nota bene: a binomial authority in parentheses indicates that the species was originally described in a genus other than Cristidorsa.

References

Cristidorsa
Lizard genera
Taxa named by Veerappan Deepak